Jolicoeur is a station on the Green Line of the Montreal Metro rapid transit system operated by the Société de transport de Montréal (STM). It is located in the Côte-Saint-Paul district in the borough of Le Sud-Ouest in Montreal, Quebec, Canada. The station opened on September 3, 1978, as part of the extension of the Green Line westward to Angrignon.

Art and architecture 
Designed by Claude Boucher, it is a side platform station, built in a shallow open cut, with the ticket hall integrated into a large glass-walled entrance pavilion. The design was influenced by the International Style architecture of Ludwig Mies van der Rohe. The floor of the platform level is decorated with a series of 42 circular ceramics by the architect.

Renovation and upgrade works 
In October 2019, work began to make the station universally accessible. To allow for the installation of elevators, the entrance building was expanded on both sides. As part of the project, a sculpture by Chloé Desjardins entitled Perspectives was installed on the main floor overlooking the platforms in June 2022. The work is inspired by the preexisting circular and triangular ceramics in the station. The upgrades were completed in December 2022, making Jolicoeur the 25th accessible station of the Metro, and the 6th station to be made accessible in 2022.

Origin of the name
This station is named for rue Jolicoeur. Father Jean-Moïse Jolicoeur founded the parish of Notre-Dame-du-Perpétuel-Secours in 1906; the street was renamed in his honour in 1914.

Connecting bus routes
There are no bus bays here and Société de transport de Montréal and RTM Roussillon (CITROUS) buses serve the station from curbside bus stops on Drake Street and Jolicoeur Street.

Nearby points of interest
 Parc de La Vérendrye
 Canal de l'Aqueduc

References

External links

Jolicoeur Metro Station - official site
Montreal by Metro, metrodemontreal.com - photos, information, and trivia
 2011 STM System Map
 RTM Page on inter municipal bus services

Green Line (Montreal Metro)
Exo bus stations
Le Sud-Ouest
Railway stations in Canada opened in 1978